Tsvetelin Ralchovski (born 3 January 1981) is a Bulgarian footballer, currently playing for Septemvri Simitli as a defender.

External links
 
 

1981 births
Living people
Bulgarian footballers
First Professional Football League (Bulgaria) players
PFC Pirin Blagoevgrad players
PFC Rodopa Smolyan players
Association football defenders